Andorra competed at the 2022 Mediterranean Games in Oran, Algeria from 25 June to 6 July 2022.

Athletics
 
Andorra competed in athletics.

Men

Women

Boules

Andorra participated in boules.

Pentaque

Karate

Andorra participated in karate.

Kumite
Women

Swimming

Andorra participated in swimming.

Men

Women

References

External links

Nations at the 2022 Mediterranean Games
2022
Mediterranean Games